Funastrum is a genus of flowering plant now in the family Apocynaceae. The name is derived from the Latin word funis, meaning "rope", and astrum, alluding to the twining stems. Members of the genus are commonly known as twinevines.

Species
, Plants of the World Online accepted the following species:
Funastrum angustissimum (Andersson) E.Fourn.
Funastrum arenarium (Decne. ex Benth.) Liede
Funastrum bilobum (Hook. & Arn.) J.F.Macbr.
Funastrum clausum (Jacq.) Schltr. – white twinevine
Funastrum crispum (Benth.) Schltr. – wavyleaf twinevine
Funastrum cynanchoides (Decne.) Schltr. – fringed twinevine
Funastrum elegans (Decne.) Schltr.
Funastrum flavum (Meyen) Malme
Funastrum glaucum (Kunth) Schltr.
Funastrum gracile (Decne.) Schltr.
Funastrum heterophyllum (Engelm. ex Torr.) Standl.
Funastrum hirtellum (Vail) Schltr. – hairy milkweed	
Funastrum lindenianum (Decne.) Schltr.
Funastrum odoratum (Hemsl.) Schltr.
Funastrum pannosum (Decne.) Schltr.
Funastrum refractum (Donn.Sm.) Schltr.
Funastrum rupicola Goyder
Funastrum suffrutescens E.Fourn.
Funastrum torreyi (A.Gray) Schltr. – soft twinevine
Funastrum trichopetalum (Silveira) Schltr.
Funastrum utahense (Engelm.) Liede & Meve

Formerly placed here
Seutera angustifolia (Pers.) Fishbein & W.D.Stevens (as F. angustifolium (Pers.) Liede & Meve)

References

External links

USDA PLANTS Profile
Kew Plant List

Asclepiadoideae
Apocynaceae genera